The 1959 Campeonato Paulista da Primeira Divisão, organized by the Federação Paulista de Futebol, was the 58th season of São Paulo's top professional football league. Palmeiras won the title for the 13th time. Comercial de São Paulo, Nacional and XV de Jaú were relegated and the top scorer was Santos's Pelé with 46 goals.

Championship
The championship was disputed in a double-round robin system, with the team with the most points winning the title and the three teams with the fewest points being relegated.

Playoffs

Top Scores

/References

Campeonato Paulista seasons
Paulista